Kamar Baldwin (born September 15, 1997) is an American professional basketball player for the Maine Celtics of the NBA G League. He played college basketball for the Butler Bulldogs.

Early life and high school career
Baldwin started playing basketball from age two. He also played football as a quarterback and ran track in middle school. Baldwin attended Apalachee High School in Winder, Georgia. As a junior, he averaged 27 points, 9.8 rebounds and 3.7 assists per game, led his team to the Sweet 16 round of the Class AAAAA state tournament and was named Region 8-AAAAA Player of the Year. In his senior season, Baldwin averaged 29.6 points, 10.8 rebounds and 4.5 assists per game. He repeated as Region 8-AAAAA Player of the Year and finished with 2,593 career points, the most in Barrow County history. Baldwin played for the Atlanta Celtics on the Amateur Athletic Union circuit. On August 6, 2015, he committed to play college basketball for Butler. Baldwin was a consensus three-star recruit and was ranked 123rd in the 2016 class by Rivals.com.

College career
On November 16, 2016, in his second career game, Baldwin made the game-winning shot in 70–68 win over Northwestern. He scored a freshman season-high 21 points and grabbed nine rebounds in an 83–78 victory over Xavier on January 14, 2017. As a freshman, Baldwin averaged 10.1 points, 3.7 rebounds and 1.7 steals per game and was unanimously named to the Big East All-Freshman Team. On December 27, 2017, he scored 31 points in a 91–89 double overtime win over Georgetown. On March 8, Baldwin scored a sophomore season-high 32 points in a 75–74 victory over Seton Hall at the Big East tournament quarterfinals. He was named to the Big East All-Tournament Team. As a sophomore, he averaged 15.7 points, 4.9 rebounds and 3.2 assists per game. On January 19, 2019, Baldwin scored a junior season-high 30 points and grabbed eight rebounds in an 80–71 win over St. John's. As a junior, he averaged 17 points, 4.9 rebounds, and 3.1 assists per game and was named to the Second Team All-Big East. 

In his senior season, Baldwin was limited in the first two games with a rib cartilage injury. He scored 31 points in a 67–58 win over Ole Miss on December 3. On January 24, 2020, Baldwin scored 31 points including the last nine points in regulation and collected a season-high eight rebounds in a 89–85 overtime win over Marquette. He had 17 points and eight rebounds on February 5, and hit a three-pointer at the buzzer to defeat Villanova 79–76. Baldwin injured his ankle in the first half of a loss to Creighton on February 23. On March 7, Baldwin scored a career-high 36 points and hit the game-winning three-pointer with a second remaining in a 72–71 win over Xavier. At the conclusion of the regular season, Baldwin was selected to the First Team All-Big East. He shared the Big East Sportsmanship Award with Jagan Mosely of Georgetown and Emmitt Holt of Providence. As a senior, Baldwin averaged 16.2 points, 4.6 rebounds and 3.3 assists per game, leaving with the fourth-most points and the third-most steals in program history.

Professional career
On August 13, 2020, Baldwin signed his first professional contract with Türk Telekom of the Turkish Super League. He averaged 6.1 points and 2.6 rebounds per game. 

On July 27, 2021, Baldwin signed with BG Göttingen of the Basketball Bundesliga.

Maine Celtics (2022–present)
On October 24, 2022, Baldwin joined the Maine Celtics training camp roster.

Career statistics

College

|-
| style="text-align:left;"| 2016–17
| style="text-align:left;"| Butler
| 34 || 23 || 26.9 || .495 || .372 || .756 || 3.7 || 1.5 || 1.7 || .5 || 10.1
|-
| style="text-align:left;"| 2017–18
| style="text-align:left;"| Butler
| 35 || 35 || 34.0 || .442 || .331 || .775 || 4.9 || 3.2 || 1.5 || .4 || 15.7
|-
| style="text-align:left;"| 2018–19
| style="text-align:left;"| Butler
| 33 || 33 || 34.2 || .447 || .311 || .850 || 4.9 || 3.1 || 1.5 || .3 || 17.0
|-
| style="text-align:left;"| 2019–20
| style="text-align:left;"| Butler
| 31 || 30 || 31.6 || .419 || .331 || .850 || 4.6 || 3.3 || 1.1 || .5 || 16.2
|- class="sortbottom"
| style="text-align:center;" colspan="2"| Career
| 133 || 121 || 31.7 || .446 || .333 || .817 || 4.5 || 2.7 || 1.5 || .5 || 14.7

References

External links
Butler Bulldogs bio

1997 births
Living people
American expatriate basketball people in Turkey
American men's basketball players
Basketball players from Georgia (U.S. state)
BG Göttingen players
Butler Bulldogs men's basketball players
Maine Celtics players
People from Barrow County, Georgia
Point guards
Sportspeople from the Atlanta metropolitan area
Türk Telekom B.K. players